Montgomeryville is a census-designated place (CDP) in Montgomery Township, Montgomery County, Pennsylvania, United States. The population was 12,624 at the 2010 census. According to a 2010 Forbes magazine/Yahoo.com survey, Montgomeryville ranks 5th in America's top 10 affordable suburbs.  It is part of the North Penn Valley region that is centered on the borough of Lansdale.

Geography
Montgomeryville is located at  (40.250388, -75.237819).

Demographics

As of the 2010 census, there were 12,624 people living in the CDP. The racial makeup of the CDP was 77.5% White Non-Hispanic, 14.6% Asian, 4.4% African American, 0.06% American Indian, 1.1% were two or more races, and 0.07% were some other race. 2.3% of the population were of Hispanic or Latino ancestry.

As of the census of 2000, there were 12,031 people, 4,114 households, and 3,278 families living in the CDP. The population density was 2,521.8 people per square mile (973.8/km2). There were 4,158 housing units at an average density of 871.5/sq mi (336.6/km2). The racial makeup of the CDP was 87.55% White, 3.26% African American, 0.06% Native American, 7.75% Asian, 0.02% Pacific Islander, 0.40% from other races, and 0.96% from two or more races. Hispanic or Latino of any race were 1.37% of the population.

There were 4,114 households, out of which 43.4% had children under the age of 18 living with them, 70.7% were married couples living together, 6.4% had a female householder with no husband present, and 20.3% were non-families. 16.2% of all households were made up of individuals, and 3.5% had someone living alone who was 65 years of age or older. The average household size was 2.87 and the average family size was 3.26.

In the CDP, the population was spread out, with 29.9% under the age of 18, 4.5% from 18 to 24, 33.8% from 25 to 44, 23.2% from 45 to 64, and 8.6% who were 65 years of age or older. The median age was 36 years. For every 100 females, there were 97.1 males. For every 100 females age 18 and over, there were 93.1 males.

The median income for a household in the CDP was $80,097, and the median income for a family was $90,391. Males had a median income of $55,777 versus $38,796 for females. The per capita income for the CDP was $28,967. About 1.7% of families and 1.9% of the population were below the poverty line, including 1.4% of those under age 18 and 2.8% of those age 65 or over.

Transportation
Five Points is an intersection located at 40° 14′ 50.67″ N and 75° 14′ 39.37″ W, in Montgomeryville. It is the intersection of PA 309, PA 463, and US 202 Business. PA 309 runs northsouth on Bethlehem Pike, PA 463 runs northwest–southeast on Cowpath Road/Horsham Road, and US 202 Business runs south along PA 309 and northeast along Doylestown Road, therefore creating five different roads.

Within the town, the US 202 Parkway runs through the southern portions from southwest-northeast.

Located at Five Points (south PA 463 side) is the Water Tower Square shopping center. This shopping center includes a Planet Fitness, Buy Buy Baby, World Market, OfficeMax, Water Tower Cinema (formerly Frank Theaters and United Artists), and a Home Depot.

Route 94 connects the mall to the Chestnut Hill neighborhood of Philadelphia, Route 96 connects Montgomeryville with Lansdale and the Norristown Transportation Center in Norristown, and Route 132 runs from the mall to Telford. The bus routes provide connections to SEPTA Regional Rail's Lansdale/Doylestown Line in nearby Lansdale and North Wales.

Notable people
Winfield Scott Hancock, U.S. Army officer in the Civil War;  Democratic candidate for presidency in 1880.
ROZES, singer (most popular with featuring in The Chainsmokers' song "Roses" - which peaked at #6 on Billboard Hot 100).

References

Census-designated places in Montgomery County, Pennsylvania
Census-designated places in Pennsylvania